The 2018–19 Women's LEN Trophy was the 20th edition of the European second-tier tournament for women's water polo clubs. It was contested in Kirishi, Russia, on 12 and 13 April 2019.

Italy's Orizzonte Catania defeated Hungary's UVSE in the final match. Orizzonte won the title for the first time in its history, gaining the only trophy that was still missing from its list of Honours. It was also the first time that a female head coach (former player Martina Miceli, gold medalist at the Athens 2004 Olympic Games) led a club to a European cup victory.

Teams
The participants were the four teams eliminated from the Euro League's quarterfinals.

|}

Final Four
The draw of the semifinals and the allocation of the Final 4 to Kirishi were announced by LEN on 13 March 2019.

Semifinals

Finals

3rd place

1st place

See also
 2018–19 LEN Euro League Women
 2018–19 LEN Euro Cup

References

External links
Official LEN website
Microplustiming (Official results website)

Women's LEN Trophy seasons
Women
T
T
L
L